Jamyang Dolma (born 24 February 1984) is a Chinese singer of Tibetan ethnicity.

Early life and education
Jamyang Dolma was born in Dêgê County, Garzê Tibetan Autonomous Prefecture, Sichuan, on February 24, 1984, to a Tibetan peasant family. She dropped out of middle school due to poverty. She was discovered in a bar when she worked there as a waitress. Then she entered the Song and Dance Ensemble of Garzê Tibetan Autonomous Prefecture. She entered the Sichuan Conservatory of Music in 2003, majoring in singing at the Department of Vocality, where she graduated in 2005.

Career
After graduation, Jamyang Dolma appeared in Fantasy Kalba.

In 2006, Jamyang Dolma attended the 3rd National Minorities Festival.

In March 2009, Jamyang Dolma sang the song "Colorful Hada" on the 50th Anniversary of the Liberation of Tibetan Serfs Variety Art Show on China Central Television (CCTV). The following June, she sang the song Mother's Miss on the 60th Anniversary of the Founding of the People's Republic of China Art Show. In December that same year, she released her album Female Country.

In February 2010, Jamyang Dolma participated in the 2010 Tibetan New Year's Gala and sang Auspicious Tibetan Calendar Year.  In the following April, she released her album China Voices. In December that same year, she sang the song The Hulunbeir Grassland.

Discography

Studio album

Singles

Personal life
On August 11, 2014, Jamyang Dolma was married to Dingzhen Quzha, a photographer on China Central Television.

References

1984 births
People from Garze
Living people
21st-century Tibetan women singers
Sichuan Conservatory of Music alumni
People's Liberation Army Academy of Art alumni
People's Republic of China Tibetan Buddhists
21st-century Chinese women singers